Peperomia woytkowskii is a plant endemic in the country of Peru. Its specimens were found on July 2, 1961, Department Junin.  It has stems that are 5 millimeters thick downward when dry. The hairs can be up to 0.5 millimeters long.

References

woytkowskii
Flora of South America
Flora of Peru